Pacific Junction is a populated place and railway junction in Westmorland County, New Brunswick, Canada.

1936 murder
In 1936, three members of the Lake family were murdered in Pacific Junction: Philip Lake, his wife Bertha Lake and her son Jackie, 20 months old). Arthur Bannister and Daniel Bannister were subsequently convicted of first degree murder and executed by hanging.

References

Bordering communities

Communities in Westmorland County, New Brunswick
Communities in Greater Moncton
Rail junctions in Canada